Roy Emerson won in the final 9–7, 6–4, 6–4 against Rod Laver.

Seeds

  Rod Laver (final)
  Andrés Gimeno (semifinals)
  Roy Emerson (champion)
  Fred Stolle (quarterfinals)

Draw

External links
 1968 Buenos Aires tennis tournament draw
 1968 Buenos Aires tennis tournament draw

Singles
Buenos A
Buenos A